This is a discography for British rock band Starsailor, all releases are on the EMI label in the UK and EMI/Artist Addiction in the US. Since 2008 they worked in the UK under Virgin Records, a sub-label of EMI Records:

Albums

Studio albums

Compilation albums

EPs

Singles

In other media

The song "Four to the Floor" was remixed and included on the soundtrack to the film Layer Cake.
"Keep Us Together" has been used frequently by Match of the Day.
Before they were released as singles, Sky Sports used instrumental versions of "Four to the Floor" and "Keep Us Together" as background music for various televised International Cricket tours.
The BBC also used an instrumental version as the background music for the Commonwealth Games 2006 interactive service.
The song "I Don't Know" from their On the Outside album was featured in the second season of Veronica Mars.
The song "Some of Us" from their Silence Is Easy album was featured in the fifth episode of Bones, in the Belgian film The Alzheimer Case and the PBS documentary "Carrier".
The song "Way to Fall" from their Love is Here album was featured in the ending credits of video game Metal Gear Solid 3: Snake Eater. It was also used in the trailer of the Dutch film Love Life with Carice van Houten.
A music video of "Bring My Love" is featured on DVD 2 of the 2 DVD set of Oldboy, released in Germany and Austria. The video consists entirely of clips from the film.
The song "Faith Hope Love" from their On the Outside album was featured in Season 2, Episode 5 – Aftermath of Criminal Minds and Season 3, Episode 12 of One Tree Hill.
The song "Tie Up My Hands" was featured on the television show Trigger Happy TV.
The song "Rise Up" was used on the finale of US TV show Eli Stone.
The song "Shark Food" was used in the German soap opera "Anna und die Liebe" (episode 155).
The song "Tell Me It's Not Over" was used by BBC One as the background to its two-minute show-reel of new drama for Autumn 2009
The song "Good Souls" was used in a poignant moment in the documentary Mayor of the Sunset Strip in which the subject, L.A. disc jockey and scenester Rodney Bingenheimer, takes his mother's ashes to London to be scattered at sea.
The song "Tie Up My Hands" was featured in the trailers for the films 25th Hour and Greta, although the song does not appear in the films themselves.
The song "Silence is Easy" was used in Season 1, Episode 3 of One Tree Hill
The song "Faith Hope Love" was used in Season 3, Episode 12 of One Tree Hill
The song "Neon Sky" was used in Season 6, Episode 13 of One Tree Hill
The song "Safe at Home" was used in Season 6, Episode 24 of One Tree Hill
The song "Four to the Floor" is used as a jingle on Guerilla Cricket when a boundary is scored.
The song "You Never Get What you Deserve" was used in Season 2 Episode 18 of Greek soap opera Ta Mistika tis Edem.

Other contributions
Live at the World Café: Vol. 15 - Handcrafted (2002, World Café) – "Good Souls"
Serve3 (2008, World Café) – "Military Madness" (Cover version of Graham Nash song)

References

Discographies of British artists
Rock music group discographies